Guzmania diffusa is a plant species in the genus Guzmania. This species is native to Ecuador and Colombia.

References

diffusa
Flora of Ecuador
Flora of Colombia
Plants described in 1948